Leptodactylus sabanensis is a species of frog in the family Leptodactylidae. 

It is also referred to by the common name Gran Sabana Thin-Toed Frog 

It is found in Venezuela, possibly Brazil, and possibly Guyana. Its natural habitats are subtropical or tropical moist montane forests, rivers, intermittent rivers, freshwater marshes, and intermittent freshwater marshes. It is not considered threatened by the IUCN.

References

"AmphibiaWeb - Leptodactylus sabanensis". amphibiaweb.org. Retrieved 2021-07-27.

sabanensis
Amphibians described in 1994
Taxonomy articles created by Polbot